Bye is a 2019 Spanish drama film directed by Paco Cabezas, starring Mario Casas, Natalia de Molina, and Ruth Díaz. Shot and set in Seville.

The film was nominated for three Goya Awards. It was produced by Apache Films and Adiós La Película AIE alongside La Claqueta PC, in association with Sony Pictures International Productions and with the participation of RTVE, Movistar+, ICAA, Orange and Junta de Andalucía.

Cast

Awards

References

External links
 

2019 films
2010s Spanish-language films
Films directed by Paco Cabezas
2019 drama films
Spanish drama films
Films set in Seville
Films shot in the province of Seville
Apache Films films
La Claqueta PC films
2010s Spanish films